Radio Ritam is a Bosnian commercial radio group, consisting of five radio stations in Bosnia and Herzegovina. This group includes the following radio stations: Radio Ritam Sarajevo, Radio Ritam Banja Luka, Radio Ritam Zenica, Radio Ritam Visoko and Radio Ritam Mostar.

References

External links 
 Official website 
 Communications Regulatory Agency of Bosnia and Herzegovina

See also 
List of radio stations in Bosnia and Herzegovina

Radio stations in Bosnia and Herzegovina
Companies based in Sarajevo
Mass media in Sarajevo